Grimstadfjord or Grimstadfjorden is a small fjord in the municipality of Bergen in Vestland county, Norway. The Grimstadfjorden lies just north of Bergen Airport, Flesland and the Norwegian naval base Haakonsvern lies on the northern shore of the fjord. The lake Nordåsvannet flows to the west into this fjord and then this fjord flows west into the large Raunefjorden. The island of Bjorøy lies at the western mouth of the Grimstadfjorden.

The German battleship Bismarck was moored here on 21 May 1941.

References

Fjords of Vestland
Geography of Bergen